The 2016–17 Ukrainian Second League is the 26th season of 3rd level professional football in Ukraine. The competition commenced on 23 July 2016 with one match from Round 1. The spring session started on 18 March 2017 with the competition ending on 2 June 2017. The fixtures were announced on 16 July 2016.

Team changes 

Prior to the season commencing at the Conference of the PFL in preparation for the season the committee decided to expand the competition to 17 teams.

Admitted teams
The following 10 teams were admitted by the PFL after participating in the 2016 Ukrainian Football Amateur League and passing attestation which continued until 15 July.

Balkany Zorya – champion (debut)
Illichivets-2 Mariupol – reserve competitions (returning after an absence of five seasons)
Inhulets-2 Petrove – group stage (debut)
Metalurh Zaporizhya – group stage (debut)
Nyva-V Vinnytsia – group stage (returning after an absence of seven seasons)
Podillya Khmelnytskyi – group stage (returning after an absence of eight seasons, however in the 2013–14 Ukrainian Second League season Dynamo represented the city of Khmelnytskyi)
Rukh Vynnyky  – finalist (previous season) (debut)
Sudnobudivnyk Mykolaiv – group stage (debut)
Teplovyk Ivano-Frankivsk – group stage (debut)
Zhemchuzhyna Odesa – quarterfinals (debut)

Withdrawn teams

Barsa Sumy withdrew from the PFL before the start of the 2016–17 season.

Relegated teams

No teams were relegated from the Ukrainian First League

Location map 
The following displays the location of teams.

Stadiums 

The following stadiums are considered home grounds for the teams in the competition.

Managers

Managerial changes

League table

Results

Position by round

Promotion play-off

The draw for promotion play-off scheduling was held on 3 June 2017.

First leg

Second leg

PFC Sumy wins 3–1 on aggregate and remains in First League. FC Balkany Zorya loses but later was promoted to the 2017–18 Ukrainian First League, due to sanctions against FC Dnipro.

Top goalscorers
The season top goalscorers were:

Awards

Round awards

Season awards
The laureates of the 2016–17 season were:
 Best player:  Ihor Khudobyak (Teplovyk-Prykarpattia Ivano-Frankivsk)
 Best coach:  Denys Kolchin (Zhemchuzhyna Odesa)
 Best goalscorer:  Ihor Khudobyak (Teplovyk-Prykarpattia Ivano-Frankivsk)

See also
 2016–17 Ukrainian Premier League
 2016–17 Ukrainian First League
 2016–17 Ukrainian Cup

References

Ukrainian Second League seasons
3
Ukraine